Masguda Islamovna Shamsutdinova (born June 1, 1955 in Kshlau-Yelga, Bashkir ASSR) is a Tatar writer and composer.

Biography
Masguda Shamsutdinova was born in Bashkortostan. She studied music in Kazakhstan and graduated from Kazan State Conservatoire in the Republic of Tatarstan. She continued her studies at the Tatar History Institute and St. Petersburg State University and received a Ph.D in 2002. The same year Shamsutdinova moved to Seattle, Washington, where she lives and works.

Honors and awards
2003 Best Composer, Art-Horde International Theater Festival
2002 Best Composer, Nauruz International Theater Festival
2000 1st Place, Tatar Theater Festival
1994 Best Composer, Tatar Theater Festival
1993 Tatarstan Republican Award for contributions to national music
1983 Diploma, Romanian Drama Festival in the USSR

Works
Shamsutdinova's compositions are influenced by Tartar folk music. She composes chamber and symphony music, and for film soundtracks.  Selected works include:
Dervish symphonic poem 2006
Symphony No.3, Genghis-Khan 2004
Marriage of Geese choral 2001
Amazons of Tartary 2002
The Butterfly on the Snow 2002
Hymn to Prophet Muhammad, Maulid an-Nabi 2006

Shamsutdinova's works have been recorded and issued on media, including:
Fables from Tartary – CD by CD Express, Issaquah, WA., 2003
The dedication Audio Tape, Songs and romances, Kazan, Tatarstan, Bars Records, 2001
Symphonic and Choir music of Tatar composers Leningrad, Melody, 1990
Music for children of Tatar composers Leningrad, Melody, 1990
Mehdi – Sufi musical mystery, Leningrad, Melody, 1990

Other publications include:
2002 - Music for piano (13 pieces for children), Publisher - Tatarstan Kitap Neshriati
2001 – Prophet’s birthday, Kazan, State University Publishing House
1999 – Sifted Time (Ilekten ilengen zaman), Ethnography research book, Publisher – Tatarstan President’s Publishing House
1995 (nr.10), 1997  (nr. 1.) – Swedish music magazine "Music" (Stockholm)
1994 (nr.23) -  "Kultur ve Sanat" (Turkey, Istanbul)
1991 (nr.6.) – Music Magazine "Sovetskaya Muzika" (Moscow)
1980-2002 - Songs and romances in Tatar magazines

References

1955 births
Living people
People from Bashkortostan
Tatar people of Russia
20th-century classical composers
Women classical composers
Tatar composers
Russian classical composers
Tatar culture
Tatar people
Saint Petersburg State University alumni
20th-century women composers